Istieus is an extinct genus of prehistoric bony fish that lived from the Santonian to the Campanian.

See also

 Prehistoric fish
 List of prehistoric bony fish

References

Late Cretaceous fish
Prehistoric bony fish genera